The Student Spaceflight Experiments Program (SSEP) provides an opportunity for student groups from upper elementary school through university to design and fly microgravity experiments in low Earth orbit (LEO). SSEP is a program of the National Center for Earth and Space Science Education (NCESSE, a project of the Tides Center), the Arthur C. Clarke Institute for Space Education, and the private space hardware company NanoRacks. SSEP operates under a Space Act Agreement between the sponsoring organizations and NASA, allowing the  International Space Station (ISS) to be utilized as a national laboratory.

History
The program was launched in June 2010, by NCESSE in the U.S. and by the Clarke Institute internationally. , SSEP has sponsored fourteen missions to LEO – two on board the Space Shuttle, and twelve to the ISS – with a thirteenth mission to the ISS announced in March 2018, and expected to fly in the spring/summer of 2019.

In the first fourteen SSEP flight opportunities, 86,800 students in grades 5 through 16 (senior undergraduate in the U.S. higher education system) participated in experiment design and proposal writing. Of 18,759 proposals received, a total of 240 experiments were selected for flight, with one from each community participating in each flight opportunity. , 206 of these experiments have been successfully launched. The 18 experiments comprising Mission 6 to the ISS were lost when the Cygnus CRS Orb-3 vehicle exploded shortly after launch on 28 October 2014.

Key dates

Process
The competition to select student projects for flight is designed to resemble a standard research proposal process. Interested groups must submit proposals in response to announced criteria; these proposals are then peer-reviewed against the criteria in a two-stage selection process, with the vast majority of proposals rejected.

Each selected experiment is provided with one mini-laboratory, which is flown on the ISS and then returned to Earth for analysis. Experiments selected for flight have included research into crystal growth, composting, cell division, seed germination, and calcium metabolism. The cost of each experiment is on the order of US$24,500, which must be raised by the community developing the experiment.

Students have an opportunity to share their research at a national conference sponsored by the Smithsonian National Air and Space Museum, NCESSE, and the Clarke Institute. Students participating in the program have also been given the chance to participate in a videoconference with space station astronauts.

References

External links
 SSEP in the News
 SSEP In Our Own Words (Essays from SSEP participants)

Science education
Science competitions
Youth science
United States educational programs
Space science
International Space Station